María del Carmen Iglesias Cano, 1st Countess of Gilbert, is a Spanish historian. She is a member of the Real Academia de la Historia since 1991 and its first female director since 2014. As Director of the Real Academia de la Historia, she has been responsible for the launch of the electronic version of Spain´s dictionary of national biography, the Diccionario biográfico español.

She holds the non-hereditary title Countess of Gisbert, which was bestowed on her by King Juan Carlos.

Biography

Education 
Iglesias studied at the Complutense University of Madrid.

Career 
Iglesias is a specialist in 18th-century history, and her publications include work on the French philosopher Montesquieu.

Iglesias was elected to medalla nº 23 of the Real Academia de la Historia on 16 June 1989 and took up her seat on 4 November 1991. She has been director of the Academy since 2014. She was elected to Seat E of the Real Academia Española on 13 April 2000, she took up her seat on 30 September 2002.

Royal House 
Iglesias has been a close friend of the Spanish royal family since the 1980s. In 1984, a year after obtaining the professorship at the Universidad Complutense de Madrid, she was appointed tutor to the Infanta Cristina in the Faculty of Political Science and Sociology. Later, between the late 1980s and 1993, she was the private teacher of Felipe, Prince of Asturias.

Bibliography
El pensamiento de Montesquieu: política y ciencia natural. 1984, republished 2005. (link to lecture on Montesquieu)

References

1942 births
Nobility from Madrid
20th-century Spanish historians
Spanish women historians
Complutense University of Madrid alumni
Members of the Real Academia de la Historia
Members of the Royal Spanish Academy
Spanish countesses
Living people
21st-century Spanish historians